Fire urchin may refer to one of several sea urchins including:

 Astropyga radiata
 Asthenosoma ijimai
 Asthenosoma marisrubri
 Asthenosoma varium

Echinoidea